Dino Boyd (born September 2, 1996) is a professional Canadian football offensive lineman for the Ottawa Redblacks of the Canadian Football League (CFL).

College career
Boyd played college football for the Rhode Island Rams from 2014 to 2017. He used a redshirt season in 2015. He transferred to the University of Cincinnati in 2018 to play for the Bearcats where he started all 13 games at left tackle.

Professional career

Kansas City Chiefs
Boyd signed as an undrafted free agent with the Kansas City Chiefs on May 4, 2019. However, he was released at the end of training camp on August 31, 2019.

Cincinnati Bengals
Boyd signed with the Cincinnati Bengals to a practice roster agreement on September 17, 2019, but was released on October 18, 2019, without having played in a regular season game.

Chicago Bears
Boyd signed a practice roster agreement with the Chicago Bears and spent the last seven weeks of the 2019 season with the team. He re-signed with the Bears for the 2020 season, but was waived on August 3, 2020.

Winnipeg Blue Bombers
On June 18, 2021, Boyd signed with the Winnipeg Blue Bombers. However, he was released at the end of training camp on July 26, 2021.

Ottawa Redblacks
On September 21, 2021, Boyd signed with the Ottawa Redblacks. After clearing COVID protocols, he was placed on the team's practice roster. He played in his first professional game on October 16, 2021, against the Montreal Alouettes. He played in three games in 2021 for the Redblacks.

Following training camp in 2022, Boyd made the team's active roster as their starting right tackle.

Personal life
Boyd was born to parents Dino Sr. and Brisha Boyd.

References

External links
Ottawa Redblacks bio

1996 births
Living people
American football offensive linemen
Canadian football offensive linemen
Chicago Bears players
Cincinnati Bearcats football players
Cincinnati Bengals players
Kansas City Chiefs players
Ottawa Redblacks players
Players of American football from Newark, New Jersey
Players of Canadian football from Newark, New Jersey
Rhode Island Rams football players
West Side High School (New Jersey) alumni
Winnipeg Blue Bombers players